The 1995 Veikkausliiga was a season of the Veikkausliiga, the top level football league in Finland. It was contested by 14 teams, with Haka Valkeakoski winning the championship.

League standings

Results

See also
Ykkönen (Tier 2)
Suomen Cup 1995

References
Finland - List of final tables (RSSSF)

Veikkausliiga seasons
Fin
Fin
1